Noah Mills (born April 26, 1983) is a Canadian model and actor. Vogue.com ranked him as one of the 'Top 10 Male Models of All Time' in September 2014. He has solidified his place as a fashion industry icon, thanks in part to his numerous Dolce & Gabbana campaigns. Mills has also been featured in advertisements for Tommy Hilfiger, Michael Kors, and Gap Inc. Models.com has called him "one of the most sought after names in the industry." He currently stars as Jesse Boone on the CBS series NCIS: Hawaiʻi.

Personal life
Mills was born in Toronto, Ontario, Canada. He was raised in Baltimore, Maryland, before he went to boarding school in Canada and Australia. After graduating boarding school in Canada, he planned to attend college to study psychology. However, a local scout approached him one day and asked if he’d be interested in modeling. He soon moved to New York and a few weeks later, he booked his first runway show, walking for Gucci.

He is the youngest of five children, with two older brothers and two older sisters.

Career
After beginning his career in 2001, Mills progressed into working with a number of fashion companies, most notably Wilhelmina Models, from which he started his model life. In 2004, Mills made his debut as a runway model for the fall Gucci and Yves Saint Laurent collections in Milan and Paris. In early 2005, he signed a contract with Dolce & Gabbana.

He has been a fixture at the Dolce & Gabbana, Versace and Michael Kors shows for many seasons now. In 2009, Mills appeared in the naked Dolce & Gabbana Anthology Fragrance campaign with a number of other established models including Claudia Schiffer, Naomi Campbell and Tyson Ballou.

In 2010, he appeared in Sex and the City 2 opposite Kim Cattrall's character, Samantha Jones. Mills became one of the models to star in Lacoste's "new look" campaign in January 2011, a different advertising concept under the new tagline, "Unconventional Chic". The ads were shot by Mert and Marcus, showing models wearing the iconic white Lacoste polo shirts worn over fancy black evening wear.

In 2011 and 2012, Mills appeared in the CBS sitcom 2 Broke Girls, playing the role of Robbie, Max's (Kat Dennings) boyfriend. He also made a cameo in Taylor Swift's 2012 video for "We Are Never Ever Getting Back Together" as her former love interest.

In 2012, Mills was ranked number three in "The Money Guys" by Models.com. In the 2013 ranking, he was ranked number five.

In 2012, Mills starred in Candyland, a short film written and directed by Jouri Smit. The film is a 19-minute art film that shows, to devastating effect, the extent to which prescription drug abuse has reached epidemic levels. The film is a silent film, but silent in the way that, though ambient noises can be heard, voices cannot.

In 2013, Mills starred in WRACKED, a short film directed by Victoria Mahoney, which he also wrote and co-produced. Mills plays Sean, who comes home after serving a five-year prison sentence and must contend with “the remains of a life interrupted.” For this role, Mills won the best actor prize in the 2013 Golden Egg Film Festival. The film was also nominated for Best Short and Best Supporting Actor (Beau Knapp).

Mills was featured as one of the faces in Details' September 2015 issue, for cover model along with thirty other top male models, which was photographed by Mark Seliger.

In 2018, Mills starred in The Brave as Sgt. Joseph "McG" McGuire, along with Mike Vogel and Anne Heche. He played a combat medic working within an elite group of army intelligence officers.

In 2019, Mills starred in The Enemy Within as Special Agent Jason Bragg, along with Jennifer Carpenter and Morris Chestnut.

In 2020, Mills joined the cast of The Falcon and the Winter Soldier.

In 2021, Mills was selected to play the supporting role as Jesse in the CBS crime drama series NCIS: Hawaiʻi.

Filmography

References

External links
 
 Noah Mills at Models.com
 
 Noah Mills Archive at TheFashionisto.com
 Model Man: Noah Mills on Working with Dolce & Gabbana for Almost Ten Years at Vogue.com

1985 births
Male actors from Toronto
Canadian expatriate male actors in the United States
Canadian male film actors
Canadian male models
Canadian male television actors
Living people
IMG Models models